Margaret River is a town in the South West of Western Australia, located in the valley of the eponymous Margaret River,  south of Perth, the state capital. Its Local Government Area is the Shire of Augusta-Margaret River.

Margaret River's coast to the west of the town is a renowned surfing location, with worldwide fame for its surf breaks including, but not limited to, Main Break, The Box, and "Rivadog" a.k.a breakline, or joey's nose. Colloquially, the area is referred to as "Margs" or "maggot creek".

The surrounding area is the Margaret River wine region and is known for its wine production and tourism, attracting an estimated 500,000 visitors annually. In earlier days the area was better known for hardwood timber and agricultural production of the finest herbs in the southwest. Also wine.

History
The town is named after the river, which is presumed to be named after Margaret Whicher, cousin of John Garrett Bussell (founder of Busselton) in 1831. The name is first shown on a map of the region published in 1839. Before British settlement the area was inhabited by the Noongar people. The first British settlers arrived as early as 1850, with timber logging commencing in around 1870. By 1910, the town had a hotel which also operated as a post office. That year the Margaret River Progress Association requested that a townsite be declared at "the Upper Margaret Bridge", because "the district is likely to be dotted with public buildings several miles apart in the near future if a townsite is not made available shortly". The inspecting district surveyor had a preference for an area near the lower bridge on Caves Road, but his preferred site was unavailable. Lots were surveyed in 1912 and the townsite was gazetted in 1913. From 1918 to 1927, the name of the townsite was officially "Margaret" but it was changed back to "Margaret River" due to local usage.

After World War I, an attempt by the Government of Western Australia to attract migrants to Western Australia (known as the Group Settlement Scheme) and establish farms in the region attracted new settlers to the town. In 1922, over 100 settlers moved into the district.

In the early 1920s, the Busselton to Margaret River Railway was built and, in 1925, the Margaret River to Flinders Bay line opened.

The Perimeter Road, a bypass to take traffic, including heavy vehicles, from Bussell Highway, to the east of the town, and also connect to a new access road to the nearby airport, was opened in December 2018 and completed in February 2019.

Geography and climate

On occasions, as in August 1955, the town has had measurable rain on every day of a month in this period. During the summer, the weather is warm, though there are usually sea breezes, and it is frequently sunny. The dry summers, coupled with strong winds, creates an environment where there is always a high risk of bush fires.

Wine region

Margaret River is the foremost Geographical Indication wine region in the South West Australia Zone, with nearly  under vine and over 138 wineries as at 2008. The region produces just three percent of total Australian grape production, but commands over 20 percent of the Australian premium wine market.

A Mediterranean-style climate, lacking extreme summer and winter temperatures, provides ideal growing conditions. The climate is described as similar to that of Bordeaux in a dry vintage.

Humidity levels are ideal during the growing period and the combination of climate, soil and viticulture practices leads to consistently high quality fruit of intense flavour. Consequently, annual vintage results continue to exceed expectations and reinforce Margaret River's reputation as one of the premium wine-producing regions of the world.

The principal grape varieties in the region are fairly evenly split between red and white; Cabernet Sauvignon, Chardonnay, Sauvignon blanc, Shiraz, Merlot, Chenin blanc and Verdelho.

Caves

Several hundred caves are located near Margaret River, all of them within Leeuwin-Naturaliste National Park. Six of these are open to the public.

The cave was first discovered by European settlers in 1850 and has been open to the public since 1904. The cave can be explored by a self-guided audio tour, and is one of the few caves in Australia offering partial disabled access.

The other five caves open to the public in the area are Jewel Cave, Lake Cave, Ngilgi Cave, Calgardup Cave and Giants Cave.  Many other caves can be accessed with a permit by experienced cavers.

Surfing breaks
The Margaret River area has acquired a range of synonyms for the collection of surf breaks nearby, with some 75 breaks along  of coastline. Usually significant surfing competitions concentrate their locale to Margarets Main Break (aka Surfers Point) which breaks in the vicinity of Prevelly at the mouth of Margaret River.

The actual range of surf breaks range from the eastern side of Cape Naturaliste down to just south of Cape Hamelin, and despite web sites and online sources calling the whole Cape Naturaliste to Cape Leeuwin region the Margaret River surfing area, conditions and break types vary along the coast.

Education
The town contains four primary schools, Margaret River Primary School, Rapids Landing Primary School, Margaret River Montessori School, and St Thomas More Catholic Primary School, and one high school, Margaret River Senior High School. All schools are located within the town itself except for Rapids Landing Primary School, which is located in the suburb of Rapids Landing.

Cultural events 
The WSL Margaret River Pro is held annually in May attracting professional surfers from across the globe. The CinefestOZ film festival stages several events across the region in late August each year.

In the media
Arte-TV produced an episode of Nouveaux paradis about Margaret River. The 2008 documentary shows interviews with (amongst others) tourist officials, surfers, and dolphin watchers.
Margaret River was also visited in the 1966 documentary film The Endless Summer. In 2013, many locals featured in the film Drift, starring Sam Worthington, as well as many surfing scenes being shot on location at local surf breaks such as Grunters and Main Break.

See also
 West Australian wine
 Great Southern (wine region)

References

Notes

Bibliography

External links
Western Australia government tourist information (including map)
The Rotary Club of Margaret River
Popular guidebook App for the Margaret River Region (works offline)
 

 
Coastal towns in Western Australia
Towns in Western Australia
Surfing locations in South West Western Australia
Wine regions of Western Australia